Iron Eagle II (also titled Iron Eagle II: The Battle Beyond the Flag) is a 1988 action film directed by Sidney J. Furie and written by Furie and Kevin Alyn Elders. It is the first sequel to the 1986 film Iron Eagle, with Louis Gossett Jr. reprising his role as Charles "Chappy" Sinclair, alongside newcomers Mark Humphrey, Stuart Margolin, Maury Chaykin, Alan Scarfe, Colm Feore, and Clark Johnson. An uncredited Jason Gedrick also returns as ace pilot Doug Masters in the film's opening scene.

The film's story is loosely based on Operation Opera, a surprise airstrike carried out by the Israeli Air Force on a nuclear reactor near Baghdad, Iraq on June 7, 1981.

Like its predecessor, Iron Eagle II received negative reviews. It also did not fare well at the box-office, with earnings of $10,497,324. Despite this, it was nominated for three Genie Awards (Best Actor in a Supporting Role, Best Sound Editing, and Best Overall Sound).

Plot
While on a routine patrol in United States airspace west of Alaska, pilots Doug "Thumper" Masters and Matt "Cobra" Cooper test the g-forces of their F-16C fighter aircraft. Their antics get them carried away, and they stray over Soviet airspace. As they are being escorted back into U.S. airspace, one of the Soviet fighters (actually F-4 Phantoms because MiG-29s were unavailable) locks onto Doug, resulting in a dogfight where Matt loses control of his plane and is too late to save Doug, who is shot down by the Soviets. The next day, the U.S. Secretary of Defense publicly denies the incident, claiming a training accident caused by a fuel system malfunction killed Doug.

At the United States Air Force Museum in Arizona, Col. Charles "Chappy" Sinclair is taken out of reserve duty and promoted to brigadier general to lead "Operation Dark Star", a top-secret military operation. He meets up with Matt and the rest of the operation's selected pilots and soldiers at an undisclosed military base in Israel. The group is shortly joined by a group of Soviet pilots that comprise the other half of the operation, much to their dismay. During their briefing, it is revealed that an unnamed Middle Eastern country has completed construction of a nuclear weapons compound capable of launching warheads towards both the United States and the Soviet Union. Their mission is to destroy the compound, as its nuclear arms will be ready within two weeks. Both the Americans and Soviets have difficulty cooperating with each other. The situation is further complicated when Matt realizes that ace pilot Yuri Lebanov is the one who shot down Doug. At the same time, he slowly develops a relationship with female pilot Valeri Zuyeniko.

After a mock dogfight followed by a fist fight that gets them grounded, Matt and Lebanov settle their differences. However, Major Bush, the lead American pilot, is killed during a training exercise due to his claustrophobia. Chappy is later informed that the joint operation is canceled. He realizes that as both the American and Soviet teams consist of delinquent soldiers, the operation was doomed to fail from the beginning. Nevertheless, he is grateful that both factions have the courage to cooperate with each other. His pep talk encourages the entire operation to continue with the mission against General Stillmore's orders.

For the mission, the F-16 units are to fire their missiles at the compound through the ventilation shafts while the MiGs provide high-altitude cover against enemy aircraft. Ground units are also necessary to take out the anti-aircraft defenses. Upon entering enemy airspace, the transport plane carrying the APCs is shot down. Chappy orders the pilots to abort the mission, but Matt and his wingman Graves disobey and provide air cover to the ground units. Both pilots are outnumbered by the opposing fighters, but Valeri and Lebanov arrive to even the playing field. Meanwhile, the enemy prepares to launch a warhead while the U.S. and Soviet forces order bombers on standby in case the operation fails. Chappy and the ground forces manage to destroy the guidance tower controlling the SAM launchers, but Hickman is killed in the process. They reach the target point, but Graves is shot down by an anti-aircraft gun. Valeri takes over while Matt provides cover. She fires her two remaining missiles, one of which penetrates through the ventilation shaft, obliterating the compound completely.

After the joint operation is congratulated, Chappy is offered continued service under General Stillmore, but he adamantly declines the offer. Matt and Valeri bid each other farewell, but Chappy reveals to him that they are flying to Moscow on Tuesday as part of a pilot exchange program.

Cast

 Louis Gossett Jr. as Colonel / Brigadier General Charles "Chappy" Sinclair
 Mark Humphrey as Captain Matt "Cobra" Cooper
 Stuart Margolin as General Stillmore
 Alan Scarfe as Colonel Vardovsky
 Sharon Brandon as Valeri Zuyeniko
 Maury Chaykin as Sergeant Neville Downs
 Colm Feore as Lieutenant Yuri Lebanov
 Clark Johnson as Captain Richie Graves
 Jason Blicker as Technical Sergeant Hickman
 Jesse Collins as Major Lionel Bush
 Mark Ivanir as Mikhail Balyonev
 Uri Gavriel as Georgi Koshkin
 Neil Munro as Edward Strappman
 Douglas Sheldon as Sergei Demitriev
 Azaria Rapaport as Stepanov
 Nicolas Coucos as M.P. Connors
 Gary Reineke as Bowers
 Michael J. Reynolds as the U.S. Secretary of Defense
 Jason Gedrick as 2nd Lieutenant Doug "Thumper" Masters (uncredited)

Production
Iron Eagle II was filmed on location in Israel. Filming locations included the Ramat David Israeli Air Force air base near Haifa, the desert flatlands, the mountains, and the coast of the Dead Sea. 

Israeli Air Force pilots performed the aerial maneuvers for the film, using General Dynamics F-16 Fighting Falcon and McDonnell Douglas F-4 Phantom II units - 69 Squadron's latter used to portray the Soviet MiG-29.

Soundtrack

The soundtrack album was released on Epic Records in 1988.

Track listing

Reception
As with its predecessor, Iron Eagle II was met with negative reviews. Film historian and reviewer Leonard Maltin noted the film's "... Humphrey may be a Tom Cruise clone, but the film makes Top Gun seem like From Here to Eternity. Kevin Thomas of the Los Angeles Times found the film to be better than the first, saying it "hasn't the sleekness of Top Gun, which it clearly tries to emulate, but it delivers the goods in its elementary fashion." In his review, Richard Harrington of The Washington Post said the film "plays like a video game. The training sequence is long and tedious, the comrade-rie is short and tedious." Variety magazine wrote that the film "nervily tries to update the formula (of the 1986 original). Plot meanders and fails to really fire its engines until deep into the story."<ref>"Review:'Iron Eagle II'." 'Variety, December 31, 1987.</ref>

Despite the negative reception, the film was nominated for three awards at the 10th Genie Awards for Best Actor in a Supporting Role, Best Sound Editing, and Best Overall Sound.

References
Notes

Citations

Bibliography

 Aloni, Shlomo and Avidror, Zvi. Hammers: Israel's Long-Range Heavy Bomber Arm, The Story of 69 Squadron. Atglen, Pennsylvania: Schiffer Publishing, 2010. .
 Beck, Simon D. The Aircraft-Spotter's Film and Television Companion. Jefferson, North Carolina: McFarland & Company, 2016. .
 Maltin, Leonard.  Leonard Maltin's 2007 Movie Guide. New York: New American Library, 2006. .
 Orriss, Bruce. When Hollywood Ruled the Skies: The Post World War II Years''. Hawthorne, California: Aero Associates Inc., 2018. .

External links 
 
 
 
 

1988 films
1988 action films
Canadian action films
American action films
Canadian aviation films
American aviation films
Carolco Pictures films
Cold War aviation films
Films about nuclear war and weapons
Films directed by Sidney J. Furie
Films set in Arizona
Films set in Israel
TriStar Pictures films
Films set in the Middle East
Films shot in Israel
Iron Eagle (film series)
Films about the United States Air Force
Israeli action films
1980s English-language films
1980s American films
1980s Canadian films